Hellinsia scripta is a moth of the family Pterophoridae. It is found in Costa Rica.

Adults are on wing in February and July.

References

Moths described in 1999
scripta
Moths of Central America